Leucauge argyra is a spider and is known for being the host of the Hymenoepimecis argyraphaga, a Costa Rican or Puerto Rican parasitoid wasp. It is found in Asia, United States and Brazil. Leucauge argyra (and many other Leucauge spp.) is known to be a colonial species, with spiders maintaining individual territories/orb webs within a scaffolding of shared support lines maintained by the group. Colonies of multi-generational individuals are often seen with some levels of size stratification (where larger individuals/adults occupy the highest web positions and smaller individuals/juveniles occupy lower web positions).

Description
Leucauge argyra has three lines on the abdomen that run parallel only about halfway across the abdomen, where the outer two bend inward before continuing parallel again through the rest of the abdomen. These markings can be somewhat variable, and different from L. venusta, where the abdomen has inverted V-markings.

The web of juveniles has an upper tangle with threads connecting it to the hub and occasionally another tangle below the orb web, but these tangles are absent in webs of adults. The upper tangle consists of a few threads that cover only a narrow section across the middle of the orb.

A similar species to L. argyra is Leucauge mariana.

Gallery

References

  (2009): The world spider catalog, version 9.5. American Museum of Natural History.

External links
 Bug Guide
 Nearctic Spider Database

argyra
Spiders described in 1842
Spiders of Central America